Shir Hayim ("A Song of Life") was a Reform Jewish synagogue and congregation at Hashomer House, Broadhurst Gardens, West Hampstead in the London Borough of Camden. It was established in 1975 and until 1988 was known as Hampstead Reform Jewish Community. Services were held on Friday evenings and Saturday mornings.

In 2020 it merged with Willesden Minyan to form a new Reform Judaism congregation, Makor Hayim.

See also
 List of Jewish communities in the United Kingdom
 List of former synagogues in the United Kingdom
Movement for Reform Judaism

References

External links
Official website
The Movement for Reform Judaism
Shir Hayim on Jewish Communities and Records – UK (hosted by jewishgen.org)

1975 establishments in England
2020 disestablishments in England
Buildings and structures in the London Borough of Camden
Jewish organizations established in 1975
Reform synagogues in the United Kingdom
Religion in the London Borough of Camden
Synagogues in London